KFPP-LP (93.3 FM) is a low-power FM radio station licensed to Woodward, Oklahoma, United States. The station is currently owned by Woodward Catholic Radio, Inc.

History
The station call sign KFPP-LP on January 26, 2017.

References

External links
 
 Oklahoma Catholic Broadcasting Network

FPP-LP
Radio stations established in 2017
2017 establishments in Oklahoma
FPP-LP
Woodward County, Oklahoma
Catholic radio stations
Catholic Church in Oklahoma